Rajendra Singh Bhandari is an Indian politician and the MLA from Badrinath Assembly constituency. He is a member of the Indian National Congress.

Positions held

References 

Cabinet 2007-12

Living people
Indian National Congress politicians from Uttarakhand
People from Chamoli district
Uttarakhand MLAs 2007–2012
Uttarakhand MLAs 2012–2017
Uttarakhand MLAs 2022–2027
Year of birth missing (living people)